Hasina Ahmed is a Bangladesh Nationalist Party (BNP) politician and a former Jatiya Sangsad member from the Cox's Bazar-1 constituency.

Career
Ahmed was elected to parliament from Cox's Bazar-1 in 2008 as a BNP nominee.

Personal life
Ahmed is married to Salahuddin Ahmed, also a fellow BNP politician and two times Jatiya Sangsad member from the same constituency.

References

Living people
Bangladesh Nationalist Party politicians
9th Jatiya Sangsad members
Women members of the Jatiya Sangsad
Year of birth missing (living people)
Place of birth missing (living people)
21st-century Bangladeshi women politicians